Sir John Charles Samuel Grenier was a Barrister and the 17th Attorney General of Ceylon. He was appointed on 30 September 1886, succeeding Francis Fleming, and held the office until his death in 1892. He was succeeded by Charles Layard.

Grenier was born in Jaffna, Ceylon on 16 June 1840, son of Frederick Charles Grenier, Secretary of the District Court, Jaffna. He started his career as a sub-editor on the Ceylon Examiner and later first secretary of the Colombo Municipality.  He was called to the Ceylon Bar in 1864 and started his legal career acting as a Puisne Judge on the Supreme Court Bench. He was called to the English Bar in 1884 and appointed Attorney-General of Ceylon in 1886. He was knighted in 1891 in particular for this work on the Civil Procedure Code. Grenier died in Colombo, Ceylon on 31 October 1892 from pneumonia aged 52.

References

1840 births
1892 deaths
Attorneys General of British Ceylon
British barristers
Ceylonese Knights Bachelor
Deaths from pneumonia in Sri Lanka
Lawyers awarded knighthoods
People from Jaffna
Sri Lankan barristers
Sri Lankan people of British descent
20th-century Sri Lankan lawyers
19th-century Sri Lankan lawyers